Events from the year 2007 in Denmark.

Incumbents
 Monarch – Margrethe II
 Prime minister – Anders Fogh Rasmussen

Events

February
 21 February – Denmark will withdraw its 460 troops from the Iraq War by August.

March
 3 March – The eviction of Ungdomshuset by Danish police results in more rioting in Nørrebro, Copenhagen, leading to about 100 arrests during a second night of protests.
 5 March – Ungdomshuset in Copenhagen, is demolished to prevent it from being re-occupied.

April
 11 April – The United States Secretary of Defense Robert M. Gates meets with the Defense Ministers of the United Kingdom, Australia, Canada, the Netherlands and Denmark as well as officials from Estonia and Romania to discuss progress in Afghanistan in expectation of a Taliban offensive.

May
 15 May – Danish protesters clash with police in Copenhagen with the Little Mermaid being doused with red paint. The clashes followed the demolition of a building in the Freetown Christiania district.
 25 May – Bjarne Riis admits that he won the Tour de France using banned substances.

August
 12 August – Denmark sends a scientific team to the Arctic to try to establish that the Lomonosov Ridge is an extension of Greenland so it can claim sovereignty over oil reserves.

September
 4 September – Denmark's intelligence service arrests several people on suspicion of plotting a bomb attack.
 28 September – The third phase of the Copenhagen Metro opens, connection it to Copenhagen Airport Travelling time between the airport and downtown Copenhagen at Kongens Nytorv is now 14 min.

October
 3 October – The Danish Royal Court announces that Prince Joachim has become engaged to Marie Cavallier.

November
 15 November – The Spinderiet shopping centre is inaugurated in Valby, Copenhagen

The arts

Architecture
 27 June – Lundgaard & Tranberg's Tietgenkollegiet in Copenhagen and 3XN's Alsion in Sønderborg each win a 2007 RIBA European Award at the Royal Institute of British Architects' annual awards ceremony in London.

Film
 25 February – At the 79th Academy Awards, Susanne Bier's After the Wedding is among the five films nominated for an Oscar for Best Foreign Language Film but the Oscar goes to the German The Lives Of Others.
 10 October – It is announced that the Danish film The Art of Crying is the winner of the 2007 Nordic Council Film Prize.

Literature

Music

Sports

Cycling
 18 March – Mie Lacota wins Omloop Het Volk.
 7–29 July – 2007 Tour de France
 15 July – Michael Rasmussen wins the 8th stage.
 25 July – Michael Rasmussen wins the 16th stage.

Football
 15 March – Brøndby IF wins 2006–07 Royal League by defeating FC Copenhagen 1–0 in the final.
 17 May – Odense Boldklub wins the 2006–07 Danish Cup by defeating FC Copenhagen 2–1 in the final.

Golf
 16 September – Søren Hansen wins the Mercedes-Benz Championship (European Tour) on the 2007 European Tour.
 14 October – Mads Vibe-Hastrup wins Madrid Open on the 2007 European Tour.

Handball
 4 February – Denmark wins bronze at the 2007 World Men's Handball Championship in Germany by defeating France 34–27.

Motorsports
 27 May – Anders Hansen wins the BMW PGA Championship on the 2007 European Tour.
 13 October – Nicki Pedersen becomes Speedway World Championship by winning the 2007 Speedway Grand Prix series.

Births

 21 April – Princess Isabella of Denmark

Deaths
 26 January – Hans J. Wegner, furniture designer (born 1914)
 13 February – Holger Vistisen, actor (born 1932)
 20 February – Carl-Henning Pedersen, painter (born 1913)
 25 February – Jytte Borberg, author (born 1917)
 1 March – Otto Brandenburg, actor and singer (born 1934)
 13 June – Jørgen Kastholm, designer (born 1931)
 24 June – Natasja Saad, rapper and reggae singer (born 1974)
 3 August – Peter Thorup, musician (born 1948)
 7 August – Ulla Strand, badminton player (born 1943)
 12 September – Isi Foighel, politician (born 1927)
 23 November – Per Wiking, television presenter (born 1931)
 20 December – Peer Hultberg, author (born 1935)

See also
2007 in Danish television

References

 
Denmark
Years of the 21st century in Denmark
Denmark
2000s in Denmark